Residence Oasis is a private housing estate on the reclaimed land of Hang Hau, Tseung Kwan O, New Territories, Hong Kong, located near MTR Hang Hau station. It was jointly developed by MTR Corporation, Sino Land and Kerry Properties in 2005. It consists of six high-rise buildings (Tower 1-3, 5-7) and a shopping arcade, The Lane.

Demographics
According to the 2016 by-census, Residence Oasis had a population of 5,870. The median age was 39.8 and the majority of residents (92.6 per cent) were of Chinese ethnicity. The average household size was 3 people. The median monthly household income of all households (i.e. including both economically active and inactive households) was HK$61,750.

Politics
Residence Oasis is located in Fu Nam constituency of the Sai Kung District Council. It is currently represented by Andrew Chan Yiu-chor, who was elected in the 2019 elections.

References

External links

Official website of The Lane

Hang Hau
Private housing estates in Hong Kong
Shopping centres in Hong Kong
Residential skyscrapers in Hong Kong
Residential buildings completed in 2005
MTR Corporation
Sino Group
Kerry Properties